Paul Henry Oehser (27 March 1904, Cherry Creek, New York – 4 December 1996, Boone, North Carolina) was a writer of three books and an editor of scientific publications.

Oehser graduated in 1925 from Greenville College in Illinois. Soon after graduation he moved to Washington, D.C. to work for the Bureau of Biological Survey as an assistant scientific editor. Beginning in 1931 he was an editor working for the Smithsonian Institution and in 1950 became director of the Institution's Editorial and Publications Division. From 1951 to 1966 he continued as director but also served as the Smithsonian Institution's public relations officer. He retired from the Institution in 1966 and then worked from 1966 to 1975 for the National Geographic Society as an editor of scientific reports. He was on the Wilderness Society's Governing Council. At various times he was secretary, bulletin editor, and president of the Cosmos Club.  He was president of the Washington Biologists’ Field Club from 1964 to 1967.

He had a wife and two sons.

Selected publications

as editor

 16 volumes 1967–68; juvenile audience.

as author
.

References

American print editors
American science journalists
American male journalists
People from Chautauqua County, New York
1904 births
1996 deaths
20th-century American non-fiction writers
Journalists from New York (state)
20th-century American male writers
20th-century American journalists